Asaperda meridiana is a species of beetle in the family Cerambycidae. It was described by Matsusushita in 1931.

References

Asaperda
Beetles described in 1931